San Martín Airport is a public use airport located  northwest of San Martín, a city in the Mendoza Province of Argentina.

Runway length includes a  displaced threshold and a  paved overrun on Runway 03. Runway 22 has an additional  of unpaved overrun. There are power lines short of Runway 03.

See also

Transport in Argentina
List of airports in Argentina

References

External links 
OpenStreetMap - San Martín Airport
OurAirports - San Martín Airport
FallingRain - San Martin Airport

Airports in Argentina
Mendoza Province